The 2014–15 Copa del Rey was the 113th staging of the Copa del Rey (including two seasons where two rival editions were played). The winners assure a place for the group stage of the 2015–16 UEFA Europa League.

Real Madrid were the defending champions, but were eliminated by Atlético Madrid 2–4 on aggregate in the round of 16.

Barcelona won the tournament by defeating Athletic Bilbao in the final, 3–1, thus achieving their record 27th title.

Schedule and format
The fixtures' schedule was released by the RFEF and the LFP on 30 May 2014 and the format is identical to the previous season.

Notes
Double-match rounds enforced away goals rule, single-match rounds did not.
Games ending in a tie were decided in extra time; and if it persisted, by a penalty shoot-out.
Real Madrid, as participant in the 2014 FIFA Club World Cup, played its Round of 32 games on 29 October 2014 and 3 December 2014.
UEFA Europa League qualification: if the Cup winners had qualified for the 2014–15 UEFA Champions League, the Cup runner-up would have qualified for the third qualifying round, then the 5th and 6th ranked teams in 2014–15 La Liga (always excluding no "UEFA license" and banned clubs) would qualify for group stage and play-off round respectively. However, if the Cup runners-up ended in Europa League places (5th or 6th), the 5th, 6th and 7th ranked teams in 2014–15 La Liga would have qualified for the group stage, play-off round and third qualifying round respectively.Similarly, if both finalists qualified for the 2015–16 UEFA Champions League, the 5th, 6th and 7th ranked teams in 2014–15 La Liga would also qualify for group stage, play-off round and third qualifying round respectively.
At the date of the draw of the first and second round, Murcia was considered a team of Segunda División yet, and Mirandés of Segunda División B.

Qualified teams
The following teams competed in the 2014–15 Copa del Rey.

Twenty teams of 2014–15 La Liga:

Almería
Athletic Bilbao
Atlético Madrid
Barcelona
Celta Vigo
Córdoba
Deportivo La Coruña
Eibar
Elche
Espanyol
Getafe
Granada
Levante
Málaga
Rayo Vallecano
Real Madrid
Real Sociedad
Sevilla
Valencia
Villarreal

Twenty teams of 2014–15 Segunda División (Barcelona B was excluded for being a reserve team and Racing Santander was sanctioned):

Alavés
Albacete
Alcorcón
Girona
Jaén
Las Palmas
Leganés
Llagostera
Lugo
Mallorca
Murcia
Numancia
Osasuna
Ponferradina
Real Betis
Sabadell
Sporting Gijón
Valladolid
Tenerife
Zaragoza

36 teams of 2014–15 Segunda División B: the top five teams of each of the 4 groups (excluding reserve teams), the five with the highest number of points out of the remaining non-reserve teams (*), the three teams relegated from 2013–14 Segunda División, and the twelve teams winners of a group of 2013–14 Tercera División (or at least the ones with the highest number of points within their group since reserve teams are excluded) that were promoted to Segunda División B.

Alcoyano
Amorebieta
Atlético Astorga
Atlético Baleares
Avilés
Barakaldo
Cádiz
Cartagena
Cornellà
Eldense
Fuenlabrada
Gimnàstic Tarragona
Guadalajara
Guijuelo
Hércules
Huesca
Jaén
La Hoya Lorca
Lealtad
Leioa
L'Hospitalet
Linense
Lleida Esportiu
Marbella
Marino Luanco
Mirandés
Oviedo
Racing de Ferrol
San Roque de Lepe
Sestao River
Somozas
Toledo
Trival Valderas
UCAM Murcia
Villanovense
Zamora

Seven teams of 2014–15 Tercera División. Teams that qualified were six of eighteen champions that were not promoted to Segunda División B (or at least the ones with the highest number of points within their group since reserve teams were excluded):

Atlético Granadilla
Gimnástica Torrelavega
Izarra
Peña Deportiva
Puertollano
Teruel
Varea

First round
The draw for First and Second round was held on 31 July 2014 at 13:00 CEST in La Ciudad del Fútbol, RFEF headquarters, in Las Rozas, Madrid. In this round 43 Segunda División B and Tercera División teams gained entry. In the draw, firstly seven teams from the 2014–15 Segunda División B (L'Hospitalet, Guadalajara, Fuenlabrada, Zamora, Lleida Esportiu, Mirandés and Guijuelo) received a bye and then remaining teams from 2014–15 Segunda División B and teams from 2014–15 Tercera División faced according to proximity criteria by next groups:

Matches

Second round
The draw was held together with the First round draw on 31 July 2014 in La Ciudad del Fútbol. In the draw, the team from 2014–15 Segunda División B or 2014–15 Tercera División, winner from First round match Oviedo v Amorebieta, received a bye. Teams from 2014–15 Segunda División gained entry in this round and faced each other. Winners of First round, together with the seven teams which received a bye, faced each other too.

Third round 
The draw was held on 22 September 2013 at 13:00 CEST in La Ciudad del Fútbol. In the draw, as Mirandés was relocated to the pot with the teams of 2014–15 Segunda División, one team from this league received a bye. Teams from Segunda División faced each other and teams from 2014–15 Segunda División B and 2014–15 Tercera División faced each other.

Matches 

Note: Sabadell received a bye.

Final phase 
The draw for the Round of 32 was held on October 17, 2014, in La Ciudad del Fútbol. In this round, all La Liga teams gained entry in the competition.

Round of 32 pairings were as follows: the six remaining teams participating in Segunda División B and Tercera División faced the La Liga teams which qualified for European competitions, this was: four teams from Pot 1 (Segunda B and Tercera) were drawn against four teams from pot 2a (champions) and the two remaining teams in pot 1 were drawn in the same way with the pot 2b teams (Europa League). The remaining team in pot 2b was drawn with a Segunda División team (Pot 3). The five remaining teams in this pot were drawn against five teams of the thirteen remaining teams of La Liga (Pot 4). The remaining eight teams of La Liga faced each other. Matches involving teams with different league tiers were played at home on the first leg the team in lower tier. This rule also  applied in the Round of 16, but not for Quarter-finals and Semi-finals, in which order of the two legs was decided by the draw.

Bracket

Round of 32

First leg

Second leg

Round of 16

First leg

Second leg

Quarter-finals

First leg

Second leg

Semi-finals

First leg

Second leg

Final

Top goalscorers

References

External links

MundoDeportivo.com 
Marca.com 
AS.com 

2014-15
1